Zajas is a village in the municipality of Kičevo, North Macedonia. Zajas was the seat of the Zajas Municipality, and is now in Kičevo Municipality.

History
In statistics gathered by Vasil Kanchov in 1900, the village of Zajas was inhabited by 2150 Muslim Albanians. 

Gjorche Petrov (" Materials for the Study of Macedonia ") wrote in 1896 about the population of Zajas:

"	... wild, predatory and rude in character, a scourge for the whole of Gorno Kichevo. They spend their time with haidutluk, cattle breeding, agriculture and gurbetlak.“

During the Albanian revolt of 1912, Zajas was the political and organizational center of the insurgent-revolutionary movement for the Kaza of Kičevo. In Zajas, a Committee / Headquarter of the uprising was set up, with the village serving as the meeting place of the Albanian troops, where they received concrete instructions and tasks in order to coordinate their political and revolutionary activity.

The village was burned by Chetnik forces and members of the Serbian army during the Balkan wars.

On 6 May 1919 the Committee for the National Defence of Kosovo called for a general uprising in Albanian regions in Yugoslavia. Although the uprising was quelled by the Yugoslav army, confrontations continued through the years 1920 and 1921, 1923,. Macedonian Archival sources show that in the first half of 1920, the activities for organizing an anti-Serb uprising among the Albanian committees were strong, with Kalosh Lazam Dani from Zajas being one of the two the main organizers of revolutionary activity in Vardar Macedonia.

Zajas is the birthplace of the National Front (Balli Kombëtar) fighter Mefail Shehu, leader of the Kičevo region during the Second World War. The Balli Kombëtar committee held a meeting in Zajas in 1942. Representatives of the Albanian tribes that attended the meeting elected Shehu as military commander of the region. Shehu's battalion patrolled villages around Zajas. At that period, the Ballist forces successfully repelled the Yugoslav partisans.

In October 1943, a general assembly was called in Zajas, where it was decided that the chairman of the committee of the Balli Kombëtar will be Mefail Shehu, along with Mefail Mehmeti as vice chairman, Begzat Vuli as treasurer and Skender Presevo as under prefect. In the autumn of 1944, the village was captured by communist guerrillas amid a bloody battle. After the battle, the OZNA killed 320 Albanians. 

During the Albanian insurgency in the Republic of Macedonia, Zajas became well known as the birthplace of Ali Ahmeti, the leader of the National Liberation Army and chairman of the DUI.

Demographics
As of the 2021 census, Zajas had 2,567 residents with the following ethnic composition:
Albanians 2,449
Persons for whom data are taken from administrative sources 117
Macedonians 1

According to the 2002 census, the village had a total of 4,712 inhabitants. Ethnic groups in the village include:
Albanians 4,682
Macedonians 4
Serbs 4 
Others 22

Culture
Zajas is notable for a distinct style of rudimentary polyphonic singing.

Sports
Local football club KF Zajazi have played in the Macedonian Second League.

Notable people
Mefail Shehu

References

External links

Villages in Kičevo Municipality
Albanian communities in North Macedonia